Rita Tornborg (born 13 December 1926) is a Swedish novelist and short story writer. She was born in South Africa, and grew up in Poland. She made her literary debut in 1970, with the novel Paukes gerilla. Other books are Salomos namnsdag from 1979, Systrarna from 1982, and the short story collection Rosalie from 1991. She was awarded the Dobloug Prize in 1995.

References

1926 births
Living people
People from Johannesburg
20th-century Swedish novelists
Dobloug Prize winners
Swedish women novelists
20th-century Swedish women writers
South African emigrants to Poland
Polish emigrants to Sweden